Matthew Douglas Renshaw (born 31 October 1964) is an Australian former swimmer of the 1980s and early 1990s.

Renshaw, a graduate of Sydney's Barker College, trained with the Carlile swimming club.

During the 1980s, Renshaw featured in Australia's  relay quartet known as the "Mean Machine", which most famously included Neil Brooks. At the 1986 Commonwealth Games in Edinburgh, he and his teammates set a games record in the final to win the  gold medal. He won a further Commonwealth Games gold medal in Auckland in 1990, swimming the heats for the winning  relay team.

Renshaw swam in two World Championships, in Madrid in 1986 and Perth in 1991.

References

1964 births
Living people
Australian male freestyle swimmers
People educated at Barker College
Swimmers from Sydney
Commonwealth Games gold medallists for Australia
Commonwealth Games medallists in swimming
Medallists at the 1986 Commonwealth Games
Medallists at the 1990 Commonwealth Games
Swimmers at the 1986 Commonwealth Games
Swimmers at the 1990 Commonwealth Games